Yug Charan (IAST: Yuga Chāraṇa;) is an Indian title meaning ‘Charan of the Era’ for poets and litterateurs whose vivacious writings voice the nationalistic aspirations of the country. It may refer to:

Literature 

 Yuga Chāraṇa, a poetic work by Makhanlal Chaturvedi published in 1956.
 Maiṃ Yuga Chāraṇa, a collection of poems by Prakash Aatur published in 1983.

Journalism 

 Yug Charan, a press and a weekly newspaper published from Jaipur.

People 
 Bhartendu Harishchandra
 Hinglaj Dan Kaviya
 Kanhaiyalal Sethia
 Makhanlal Chaturvedi
 Manohar Sharma
 Padmanābha
 Ramdhari Singh Dinkar
 Ravidas
 Shrikrishna Saral

References

See also 

 Rashtrakavi (disambiguation)
 Kaviraja

Cultural history of India
Linguistic history of India
Charan
Titles in India
Indian words and phrases